Howard Montgomery (born August 22, 1940) is a former professional basketball player for the San Francisco Warriors of the NBA. He played a total of 20 games.

References 

1940 births
Living people
American men's basketball players
San Francisco Warriors draft picks
San Francisco Warriors players
Small forwards
Texas–Pan American Broncs men's basketball players